Oneirophrenia (from the Greek words "ὄνειρος" (oneiros, "dream") and "φρήν" (phrēn, "mind")) is a hallucinatory, dream-like state caused by several conditions such as prolonged sleep deprivation, sensory deprivation, or drugs (such as ibogaine). Oneirophrenia is often confused with an acute case of schizophrenia due to the onset of hallucinations.   The severity of this condition can range from derealization to complete hallucinations and delusions. Oneirophrenia was described for the first time in the 1950s but was studied more in the 1960s. Although it is still cited in diagnostic manuals of psychiatry, such as DSM-IV and in the International Statistical Classification of Diseases and Related Health Problems (ICD), oneirophrenia as a separate entity is out of fashion nowadays.

Symptoms
Oneirophrenia is often described as a dream-like state that can lead to hallucinations and confusion. Feelings and emotions are often disturbed but information from the senses is left intact separating it from true schizophrenia.

Causes
Oneirophrenia can result from long periods of sleep deprivation or extreme sensory deprivation. The hallucinations in oneirophrenia are increased or derive under decreased sensory input. Psychoanalysts, such as Claudio Naranjo, in the sixties have described the value of ibogaine-induced oneirophrenia for inducing and manipulating free fantasy and dream-like associations in patients under treatment.

Diagnosis

Differential diagnosis

Oneirophrenia and schizophrenia are often confused although there are distinct differences between the conditions. Oneirophrenia has some of the characteristics of schizophrenia, such as a confusional state and clouding of consciousness, but without presenting the dissociative symptoms which are typical of that disorder. Oneiophrenia often begins with the inability to focus on things while schizophrenia frequently starts with a traumatic event. Persons affected by oneirophrenia have a feeling of dream-like derealization which, in its extreme form, may progress to delusions and hallucinations. Therefore, it is considered a schizophrenia-like acute form of psychosis which remits in about 60% of cases within a period of two years. It is estimated that 50% or more of schizophrenic patients present oneirophrenia at least once.

Treatments
Oneirophrenic patients are resistant to insulin and when injected with glucose, these patients take 30 to 50% longer to return to normal glycemia. The meaning of this finding is not known, but it has been hypothesized that it may be due to an insulin antagonist present in the blood during psychosis. However, there is currently no known treatment for oneirophrenia.

History
Oneirophrenia was studied in the 1950s by the neurologist and psychiatrist Ladislas J. Meduna (1896–1964), also known as the discoverer of one of the forms of shock therapy, using the drug metrazol. Although oneirophrenia was recognized as a specific condition in the 1950s, it was not studied in depth until the 1960s. During its beginning stages oneirophrenia was studied very closely with schizophrenia as an acute form due to the relationship between their symptoms. It wasn't until greater research that oneirophrenia became its own mental disease.

References

Neurological disorders
Obsolete terms for mental disorders